Kevin Fickentscher (born 6 July 1988) is a Swiss professional footballer who plays for FC Sion as a goalkeeper.

Career
Fickentscher was born in Nyon, and initially began his footballing career with local side FC Rolle before a move to the academy of FC Lausanne-Sport in 2000. After a stay of four years, he was picked by German club SV Werder Bremen, where he went on to feature for the under-19 team but did not really break into the reserves, making two appearances for them.

This prompted a move back to Switzerland for him as he joined then-Swiss Challenge League team FC La Chaux-de-Fonds for the 2008–09 season.

The following year Fickentscher moved up to Swiss Super League with FC Sion. After joining the club, he played sparsely for the first team, featuring far more for the reserves. In the summer of 2013 he decided to return to FC Lausanne-Sport in order to get more playing time, signing on a two-year loan, allowing him to return to Sion in 2015 when his main competitor in goal, Andris Vaņins, would be out of contract at the club.

References

External links
 
 

1988 births
Living people
People from Nyon
Association football goalkeepers
Swiss men's footballers
Switzerland under-21 international footballers
Switzerland youth international footballers
SV Werder Bremen II players
FC La Chaux-de-Fonds players
FC Sion players
FC Lausanne-Sport players
Swiss Super League players
Swiss Challenge League players
Swiss expatriate footballers
Swiss expatriate sportspeople in Germany
Expatriate footballers in Germany
Sportspeople from the canton of Vaud